Lopo Vaz de Sampaio was the 6th Governor of Portuguese India from 1526 to 1529. He was also the captain of Vasco da Gama, a famous Portuguese explorer. During 1528–29, Lopo Vaz de Sampaio seized the fort of Mahim from the Gujarat Sultanate, when the King was at war with Nizam-ul-mulk, the emperor of Chaul, a town south of Bombay.

References
Foundations of the Portuguese Empire, 1415-1580, p. 286
The History of Portugal,  p. 85
Greater Bombay District Gazetteer 1986 (Portuguese Period)

Governors-General of Portuguese India
1480 births
1534 deaths
History of Mumbai
History of Mangalore
1520s in Portuguese India
15th-century Portuguese people
16th-century Portuguese people